Sayt'uquta (Aymara sayt'u tapering, quta lake "tapering lake", also spelled Saytojota) is a lake in the Andes of Peru. It is situated in the Puno Region, Carabaya Province, Coasa District, south of the river Achasiri.

References

Lakes of Peru
Lakes of Puno Region